"Dionysus" is a song by South Korean boy band BTS. It was released digitally on April 12, 2019, as part of the extended play Map of the Soul: Persona.

Background and release 
Big Hit Entertainment teased the song title when they posted a short description of Dionysus on their official website. Upon doing so it trended on Twitter worldwide. The song was announced to be on their album tracklist Map of the Soul: Persona a few days before the scheduled release of April 12, 2019. The track was also hinted at when teaser pictures of the members holding grapes were released.

Promotion 
BTS promoted the song in Korea on the shows Inkigayo, Show! Music Core, Music Bank, and M Countdown. BTS gave a high-octane performance of the song at the 2019 Melon Music Awards and 2019 Mnet Asian Music Awards, where the group swept all grand prizes.  The song was also performed at the 2019 SBS Gayo Daejeon and the 2019 KBS Song Festival.

Composition and lyrics 
In a press release RM described the song as, "the joy and pain of creating something” and “an honest track". It is named after the Greek god of the same name, known for debauchery and excess. It is in the genre of rap-rock, synth-pop, and hip-hop and consist of multi-part hooks, a trap breakdown, an ending chorus that has double-time drums and features Jin's 'rocking adlibs' throughout the song.

Lyrically, the song talks about their stardom, legacy, and artistic integrity. Some of the nuances may be difficult to understand because of the word play that gets lost in translation. On the surface it may seem like a party song with the group shouting “Drink, drink, drink!” at different intervals, but in reality, the lyrics call for getting drunk on art, in the creative process. While "alcohol" in Korean is "술", "art" in Korean is "예술". Also, looking deeper into the lyrics, it shows self reflection such as when Suga raps, “What does it matter if I’m an idol or an artist?” It links back to their previous song "Idol" that asked the same reflective questions."

Reception 
Jason Lipshutz of Billboard called the song, "the most outlandish song BTS has ever released" and a "harbinger". Jess Lau from The 405 called "Dionysus" the "real stand out single" and "full of attitude and confidence", while Salvatore Maicki from Fader called it a "booze-filled rager". In the review of "The 50 best albums of 2019", NME hailed “Jin’s spine-tingling falsetto wails during the final headbang-worthy section of ‘Dionysus’” as the "Best Moment" from the album.

Charts

Certifications

Accolades

References 

2019 songs
BTS songs
Korean-language songs
Rap rock songs
Songs written by Pdogg
Songs written by J-Hope
Songs written by RM (rapper)
Songs written by Supreme Boi
Songs written by Suga (rapper)